Claudius Colas (Saint-Huruge, France, 29 November 1884 - Battle of the Marne, 11 September 1914). , also known as Profesoro V. Esperema, was a French Esperantist. In 1910, he created the constructed language Adjuvilo, which was a complete language that was never meant to be spoken but instead an effort to help create dissent in the then-growing Ido movement.  In 1910, he co-founded IKUE, the foremost organization of Catholic Esperantists in the world.
He died during the early days of World War I.

References 

French Esperantists
Constructed language creators
Roman Catholic activists
1884 births
1914 deaths
French military personnel killed in World War I